Frontier North, Inc. is a local telephone operating company owned by Frontier Communications.

History
Frontier North was founded as Contel North, Inc., incorporated in Wisconsin in 1992.

GTE acquisition of Contel
Contel was acquired by GTE in 1993. Following its acquisition by GTE, Contel North was renamed GTE North, Inc..

In 1993, Iowa, Missouri, Minnesota, and Nebraska were split off from GTE North into a new company called GTE Midwest, Inc. ConTel of Illinois, ConTel of Indiana, ConTel of Pennsylvania, and ConTel Quaker State were all merged into GTE North.

Acquisition by Verizon
In 2000, parent company GTE merged with Bell Atlantic, becoming Verizon Communications. At this point the company's name was legally changed to Verizon North, Inc.

Sale to Frontier
In 2009, Verizon Communications created a company, New Communications ILEC Holdings, to be sold to Frontier Communications. Verizon North was included with the new company. Frontier purchased the company in 2010. Verizon North's operations in Pennsylvania were spun off into a separate company called Verizon North Retain since those operations were not included in the sale to Frontier. That company was merged into a new company named Verizon North in 2010. The sale became final July 1, 2010, and the company's name was changed to Frontier North, Inc.

Frontier North, Inc. is a current operating company serving Illinois, Indiana, Michigan, Ohio, and Wisconsin.

See also
Frontier Midstates
Verizon North

Sources
Verizon North, Inc.

References

Frontier Communications
Economy of the Midwestern United States
Telecommunications companies established in 1992